Sonolite is a mineral with formula Mn9(SiO4)4(OH,F)2. The mineral was discovered in 1960 in the Sono mine in Kyoto Prefecture, Japan. In 1963, it was identified as a new mineral and named after the Sono mine.

Description
Sonolite is transparent to translucent and is red-orange, pinkish brown to dark brown in color and colorless in thin sections. Sonolite is the manganese analogue of clinohumite, a dimorph of jerrygibbsite, and a member of the humite group.

The mineral occurs in metamorphosed manganese-rich deposits. Sonolite has been found in association with calcite, chlorite, franklinite, galaxite, manganosite, pyrochroite, rhodochrosite, tephroite, willemite, and zincite.

History
In 1960, Mayumi Yoshinaga was investigating alleghanyite and other manganese orthosilicates in Japan. He discovered a dull, red-brown mineral on the first level ore body of the Sono Mine, and later from a number of other sites. Using samples from ten locations in Japan and one in Taiwan, the mineral was described in 1963 and identified as a new mineral species. It was named sonolite after the mine in which it was first found and the name was approved by the International Mineralogical Association.

Distribution
, sonolite has been found in Austria, France, Japan, Kyrgyzstan, Romania, Russia, Sweden, Switzerland, Taiwan, and the United States. The type material is held at Harvard University in Cambridge, Massachusetts, US.

References

Bibliography

Further reading

External links

Monoclinic minerals
Minerals in space group 14
Manganese(II) minerals
Nesosilicates
Hydroxide minerals
Fluorine minerals